Arivaldo Alves dos Santos (born November 19, 1980), known as just Ari, is a Brazilian football player.

Club statistics

References

External links

jsgoal

1980 births
Living people
Brazilian footballers
Brazilian expatriate footballers
Expatriate footballers in Japan
J1 League players
Kashima Antlers players
Esporte Clube Bahia players
Fortaleza Esporte Clube players
Sport Club Internacional players
Atlético Clube Goianiense players
Association football midfielders